Omega Seiki Mobility is an Indian electric vehicle manufacturer that is developing its own line of commercial EVs primarily deployed with e-commerce for last-mile delivery. Headquartered in New Delhi, India, Omega Seiki serves as a separate business auto vertical of the Anglian Omega Group. The company's first vehicle - Rage+, was indigenously designed and developed in its manufacturing facility in Faridabad, Haryana. Launched in February 2020 at the Auto Expo 2020, Rage+ is claimed to be India's first smart electric cargo three-wheeler. Recently, the company also unveiled a refrigerated vehicle - Rage+ Frost that will assist in delivery of food and pharmaceuticals, particularly the COVID-19 vaccine. Going forward, Anglian is looking to invest US$300–600 million in its e-mobility venture as it is committed to build India's first global electric cargo company.

History
Anglian Omega Group collaborated with ADM Technologies in 2018 and expanded its expertise into electric vehicle mobility under a separate business entity, Omega Seiki Mobility. Omega Seiki Mobility, also known as OSM, serves as a part of the larger Anglian Omega Network. The network is a global coalition of family owned business that was founded by Satya Pal Narang in 1971. Traditionally dealing in bright bar steel since its inception, the group after achieving an eminent position in the steel market, started investing in the infrastructure segment and developed several large-scale warehousing and cold storage facilities across the country. Today, Anglian Omega has investments in various business sectors like high-tech auto components, supply chain management services, financial services, hospitality and sports, spread across multiple Asian markets as well as in Switzerland and Germany in Europe.

OSM made a foray in the vehicle manufacturing space with the launch of its product - Rage+ at the Auto Expo 2020.

Production
OSM presently has manufacturing units in and around Delhi-NCR as well as in Pune and Chennai. With Delhi-NCR region offering a high demand for the e-commerce sector, the company has set up an R&D as well as a manufacturing facility in Faridabad, while Manesar, Pune and Chennai locations serve as the manufacturing units. This enables OSM's business to cater to three major hubs for OEMs in Indian automotive industry.

Faridabad Facility
OSM's plant located in Sector 58, IMT Faridabad is a facility with an annual capacity of 12,000 vehicles in phase 1 of the EV project. The current Faridabad plant with an installed capacity of 1000 units monthly has been operational since June 2020. The company intends to develop the Faridabad centre as the mother unit which can aid other satellite plants across the country, wherein completely knocked down (CKD) kits could be assembled for an optimized cost structure. In order to expand its project, the Delhi-based organization plans to setup more facilities across the country with the investment being around 200 crores in multiple phases.

References

Electric vehicle infrastructure developers
Manufacturing companies based in Delhi
Electric vehicle manufacturers of India
Battery electric vehicle manufacturers
2018 establishments in Delhi
Vehicle manufacturing companies established in 2018
Three-wheeled motor vehicles
Electric vehicle industry